Byssonectria fusispora is a species of apothecial fungus belonging to the family Pyronemataceae.

This is a European species appearing as bright yellow-orange discs up to 3 mm in diameter thickly clustered on soil and rotting plant material, often at fire sites.

References

Byssonectria fusispora at Index Fungorum

Pezizales
Fungi described in 1846